The Best of The Stylistics is a compilation album released by the American soul group The Stylistics.

Released in 1975, the album became a big success in the UK when it reached No.1. Hitting the pinnacle three times during the year, the album remained at No.1 for 9 weeks in total. Helped largely by TV advertising, it became the biggest album of the group's career and the UK's top seller of 1975. It also reached No.41 in the US - although their popularity was beginning to decline there. 

Following its success, several albums entered the charts including their latest, Thank You Baby, which reached No.5 at the same time the compilation was No.1.

Another version of the album (The Very Best of The Stylistics) with a similar cover but with an alternate track listing was released by H & L Records (Phonogram) in 1983. The album has since been released on CD as a compilation of this and Volume two.

Track listing

Chart positions

Certifications

The Best of the Stylistics Volume II 

A follow-up compilation was released the following year, subtitled Volume 2. The 1976 album mirrored the earlier success by also reaching No.1 in the UK Charts. This album featured the group's first No.1 single "Can't Give You Anything (But My Love)", which had been released since the previous compilation.

This album was released on the newly founded H&L Records, which had been formed after the break-up of Avco Records, The Stylistics being their biggest act.

Track listing

Chart positions

References

External links
The Best of The Stylistics at Discogs
The Best of The Stylistics Volume II at Discogs

The Stylistics albums
1975 compilation albums
1976 compilation albums
Albums produced by Hugo & Luigi
albums produced by Thom Bell